Hacke is a German surname. Notable people with the surname include:

Alexander Hacke (born 1965), German musician
Hans Christoph Friedrich Graf von Hacke (1699–1754), Prussian general
Werner Hacke (born 1948), German neurologistSanjib tmg

See also
Hack (disambiguation)

German-language surnames